Mount Hobson is the highest mountain on Great Barrier Island, New Zealand.

Geography

Various mountain tracks allow relatively easy access to the summit, with the shortest (2 hour) track leading through the famous Windy Canyon. Great views over the island to the Coromandel Peninsula and the Poor Knights Islands are often possible from the top of the mountain. The summit area is a breeding ground for the black petrel, and the track in this part is mostly composed of boardwalks and stairs to protect the breeding areas and prevent erosion. A number of rare and declining plants on the mainland are largely restricted (or completely restricted) to Great Barrier Island are found on Mount Hobson, these include, Pittosporum kirkii, Epacris sinclairii, Kunzea sinclairii, and also Olearia allomii.

Geology

Mount Hobson is the caldera of a complex rhyolite lava dome, which was active between 12 and 8 million years ago as a part of the Coromandel Volcanic Zone.

References

Great Barrier Island
Miocene lava domes
Hobson